"They Don't Know" is a song produced by Tim & Bob and co-written and performed by American contemporary R&B singer Jon B, issued as the third single from his second studio album Cool Relax. The radio edit version and its remix sampled "Ten Crack Commandments" and "The World is Filled", both performed by The Notorious B.I.G. The song is his biggest hit to date on the Billboard Hot 100, peaking at #7 in 1998.
Background Vocals : Jon B and ATLass

Music video

The official music video for the song was directed by Christopher Erskin.

Chart positions

Weekly charts

Year-end charts

Certifications

|}

References

External links
 
 

550 Music singles
1997 songs
1998 singles
Jon B. songs
Music videos directed by Christopher Erskin
Song recordings produced by Tim & Bob
Songs written by Jon B.
Songs written by Tim Kelley
Songs written by Bob Robinson (songwriter)
Contemporary R&B ballads
Soul ballads
1990s ballads